The Bavarian State Opera is a German opera company based in Munich. Its main venue is the Nationaltheater München, and its orchestra the Bavarian State Orchestra.

History

The parent ensemble of the company was founded in 1653, under Electress consort Princess Henriette Adelaide of Savoy, when Giovanni Battista Maccioni's L'arpa festante was performed in the court theatre. In 1753, the Residence Theatre (Cuvilliés Theatre) was opened as a major stage. While opera performances were also held in the Prinzregententheater (completed in 1901), the company's home base is the Nationaltheater München on Max-Joseph-Platz.

In 1875, the Munich Opera Festival took place for the first time.  Sir Peter Jonas became the general manager in 1993, the first British general manager of any major German-speaking opera house.  In 2008, Nikolaus Bachler became Intendant (general manager) of the opera company, and Kirill Petrenko became Generalmusikdirektor (GMD) in 2013. In 2014, the Bavarian State Opera received the Opernhaus des Jahres (opera house of the year) award from Opernwelt magazine. In October 2015, the company announced the extensions of the contracts of Bachler and of Petrenko through August 2021.  Both Bachler and Petrenko stood down from their respective posts at the close of the 2020–2021 season.  

Intendant 

 Johann Nepomuk von Poißl (1824–1848)
  (1848–1851)
 Franz von Dingelstedt (1851–1858)
  (1868–1893)
 Ernst von Possart (1895–1906)
 Albert von Speidel (1907–1912)
 Clemens von Franckenstein (1912–1918)
  (1918–1924)
 Clemens von Franckenstein (1924–1934)
 Hans Knappertsbusch (1934–1935)
 Oskar Walleck (1935–1937)
 Clemens Krauss (1937–1940)
  (1945–1952)
  (1952–1967)
 Günther Rennert (1967–1976)
 August Everding (1977–1982)
 Wolfgang Sawallisch (1982–1993)
 Peter Jonas (1993–2006)
 Kent Nagano (2006–2008)
 Nikolaus Bachler (2008–2021)
  (2021–present)

Generalmusikdirektor 

 Franz Lachner (1836–1867)
 Hans von Bülow (1864–1869)
 Franz Wüllner (1870–1877)
 Hermann Levi (1872–1896)
 Richard Strauss (1894–1896)
 Max Erdmannsdörfer (1896–1898)
 Bernhard Stavenhagen (1898–1902)
 Hermann Zumpe (1901–1903)
 Felix Mottl (1904–1911)
 Bruno Walter (1913–1922)
 Hans Knappertsbusch (1922–1935)
 Clemens Krauss (1937–1944)
 Hans Knappertsbusch (1945)
 Georg Solti (1946–1952)
 Rudolf Kempe (1952–1954)
 Ferenc Fricsay (1956–1958)
 Joseph Keilberth (1959–1968)
 Wolfgang Sawallisch (1971–1992)
 Peter Schneider (interim, 1992–1998)
 Zubin Mehta (1998–2006)
 Kent Nagano (2006–2013)
 Kirill Petrenko (2013–2021)
 Vladimir Jurowski (2021–present)

World premieres

Recordings
Bavarian State Opera has issued numerous recordings under record labels such as Deutsche Grammophon. In May 2021, it launched its own recording label, Bayerische Staatsoper Recordings (BSOrec).

Among the company's noted recordings are the 1989 video recording of Wagners'  Der Ring des Nibelungen at the Bayreuth Festival conducted by Wolfgang Sawallisch, which won Best Video in the 1993 Gramophone Classical Music Awards. The 1973 recording of Richard Strauss's  Der Rosenkavalier, conducted by Carlos Kleiber and released in 2008, was highly acclaimed and selected as Editor's Choice in the April 2009 issue of Gramophone Magazine. 

At International Opera Awards, the  Bayerische Staatsoper won the 2018 the Opera Company Award. Their recording of Handel's Agrippina, directed by Barrie Kosky from the Royal Opera House, has been shortlisted for the 2018 Opera Awards.

In 1977, a recording by the Bavarian State Opera was selected by NASA to be included on the Voyager Golden Record, a gold-plated copper record that was sent into space on the Voyager space craft. The record contained sounds and images which had been selected as examples of the diversity of life and culture on Earth. In the recording, soprano Edda Moser sings "Der Hölle Rache kocht in meinem Herzen" from Mozart's opera, The Magic Flute, conducted by Sawallisch.

References

External links 
 
 Bayerisches Staatsorchester history
 Bayerisches Staatsorchester at the Bach Cantatas Website

Music in Munich
1653 establishments in the Holy Roman Empire
17th-century establishments in Bavaria
Organizations established in the 1650s
Musical groups established in the 17th century
German opera companies
Theatres in Munich